Naxos Island National Airport is an airport in Naxos, Greece . It is located near Agios Prokopios, 3 km from Naxos City. The airport opened in 1992.

Airlines and destinations
The following airlines operate regular scheduled and charter flights at Naxos Island Airport:

Statistics

Accidents and incidents
 On 12 December 2009, an Olympic Air ATR 42 (registration SX-BPA), performing flight OA6 from Athens to Naxos, was on a visual approach to runway 36 and had been handed off to Naxos Tower by air traffic control. The airplane was then seen in full landing configuration on final approach to Paros' runway 35 (length 710 meters/2300 feet) on the adjacent island. Paros Tower made contact on its frequency and Naxos Tower and ordered the aircraft to go around. The crew aborted the approach and subsequently landed safely in Naxos.
 On 12 July 2019, a Sky Express ATR 42 (registration SX-FOR), about to perform flight GQ-405 from Naxos to Athens, was backtracking the runway for departure, when the aircraft went off the paved surface of the runway and came to a stop with the main gear in a ditch and the lower fuselage on the runway edge. There were no injuries, but the airport was closed for the rest of the day as a precautionary measure.

See also
Transport in Greece

References

Airports in Greece
Buildings and structures in Naxos